Caesars Head is an unincorporated community and census-designated place (CDP) on top of Caesars Head, a mountain in Greenville County, South Carolina, United States. It was first listed as a CDP in the 2020 census with a population of 84.

The remainder of the CDP is within Caesars Head State Park.

US 276 (Geer Highway) leads north  to Brevard, North Carolina, and southeast  to Greenville.

Demographics

2020 census

Note: the US Census treats Hispanic/Latino as an ethnic category. This table excludes Latinos from the racial categories and assigns them to a separate category. Hispanics/Latinos can be of any race.

References 

Census-designated places in Greenville County, South Carolina
Census-designated places in South Carolina